The M Countdown Chart is a record chart on the South Korean Mnet television music program M Countdown. Every week, the show awards the best-performing single on the chart in the country during its live broadcast.

As of  2023, 5 singles have achieved number one on the chart, and 5 acts have been awarded first-place trophies. "Fighting" by Seventeen BSS currently holds the highest score of the year, with 10,669 points on the February 16 broadcast. So far, only one song has collected a trophy for three weeks and achieved a Triple Crown: BSS's "Fighting".

Scoring system

Chart history

References 

2023 in South Korean music
2023 record charts
Lists of number-one songs in South Korea